Syed Muhammad Muqim was an 18th-century Bengali poet, author and philosopher who was active during the advent of company rule in Bengal. His puthis are notable as they are interspersed with his own philosophical thoughts on prosody, music, astrology and religions.

Background
Muqim was born in the 18th century, to a Bengali Muslim family of Syeds in the neighbourhood of Noapara in Chittagong. His father, Syed Muhammad Daulat, had origins in Feni. Muqim later became a disciple of Sufi poet Ali Raza, and he was also inspired by the poetry of Muhammad Danesh. After losing his father at an early age, Muqim started his career at the record office of Ali Akbar Chowdhury, a prominent zamindar of Chittagong. Bichitra Sen of The Azadi asserts that there were two poets of Chittagong with the name Muhammad Muqim.

Works
Faydul Muqtadi (1773)
Tajul-Bakāwali, his own Bengali rendition of the Persian romance Gul-e-Bakāwali (which also has references to colonial rule in Chittagong)
Kalakam
Mrigābôti, his own Bengali rendition of a romance about fairies
Aiyub Nôbir Kôtha (About the prophet Job)

References

18th-century Bengali poets
18th-century Indian Muslims
Bengali male poets
People from Chittagong
Place of death unknown
People from Feni District
18th-century births
Year of death unknown

Bengali Muslims